Nirundon Lepananon (born 4 December 1956) is a Thai sports shooter. He competed in the men's 50 metre free pistol event at the 1984 Summer Olympics.

References

1956 births
Living people
Nirundon Lepananon
Nirundon Lepananon
Shooters at the 1984 Summer Olympics
Place of birth missing (living people)
Nirundon Lepananon